Leibbrand is a surname. Notable people with the surname include:

 Werner Leibbrand, German psychiatrist and medical historian
 Annemarie Leibbrand-Wettley, German medical historian

See also
 Leibbrandt
 Lybrand
 Liutprand (disambiguation)

External links
 Leibbrandt.com